Seaboard Air Line Railway Building, also known as the Wainwright Building, is a historic office building located in Norfolk, Virginia. It was built in 1925–1926 as headquarters for Seaboard Air Line Railroad.  It is a nine-story, 92,000 square-foot, steel reinforced concrete building.  It is "V"-shaped and faced in textured yellow brick with numerous stone decorative elements in the Late Gothic Revival style.

It was listed on the National Register of Historic Places in 2013.  The building was converted to luxury apartments in 2013 and is now known as The Wainwright Downtown.

References

External links
 The Wainwright Downtown website

Commercial buildings on the National Register of Historic Places in Virginia
Commercial buildings completed in 1926
Gothic Revival architecture in Virginia
Buildings and structures in Norfolk, Virginia
National Register of Historic Places in Norfolk, Virginia
Downtown Norfolk, Virginia